The 1963 FA Charity Shield was the 41st FA Charity Shield, an annual football match held between the winners of the previous season's Football League and FA Cup competitions. The match was contested by Everton who had won the 1962–63 Football League, and Manchester United, who had won the 1962–63 FA Cup, at Goodison Park, Liverpool, on 17 August 1963. Everton won the match 4–0, with goals from Jimmy Gabriel, Dennis Stevens, Derek Temple and a penalty from Roy Vernon.

Match details

See also
1962–63 Football League
1962–63 FA Cup

References

1963
Charity Shield 1963
Charity Shield 1963
Comm
Charity Shield 1963